Mitchel Steenman (born 17 June 1984 in Dirksland) is a Dutch rower.

Steenman took part in the World Championships of 2007 in Munich becoming tenth in the eights. He qualified for the 2008 Summer Olympics in Beijing with the Dutch eights forming a team with Olaf van Andel, Jozef Klaassen, Meindert Klem, David Kuiper, Diederik Simon, Olivier Siegelaar, Rogier Blink and cox Peter Wiersum. Due to an injury Siegelaar was replaced by Reinder Lubbers during the tournament.

References

1984 births
Living people
Dutch male rowers
Rowers at the 2008 Summer Olympics
Rowers at the 2012 Summer Olympics
Rowers at the 2016 Summer Olympics
Olympic rowers of the Netherlands
People from Dirksland
World Rowing Championships medalists for the Netherlands
European Rowing Championships medalists
Sportspeople from South Holland
21st-century Dutch people